Forster may refer to:

 Förster (or Foerster), a German surname meaning "forester"
 Forster (surname), an English surname, sometimes Anglicised from the German Förster
 Forster, New South Wales, a coastal town in southeast Australia
 Forster Motorsport, an auto racing team in Wallsend, Tyne and Wear, England
 Forster Music Publisher, Inc., a sheet music publisher founded in 1916 in the US city of Chicago
 Forster Square, a central square in Bradford, West Yorkshire, England
 USS Forster (DE-334), a destroyer escort ship launched in 1943; commissioned to the Atlantic and Mediterranean during World War II

See also
 Bradford Forster Square railway station, a railway station near Forster Square
 Forster's tern, a seabird of the tern family, Sternidae
 Forester (disambiguation)
 Forrester (disambiguation)
 Foster (disambiguation)
 Fosters (disambiguation)